Hans Keller (1919–1985) was an Austrian-born British musician.

Hans Keller may also refer to:

 Hans Keller (ice hockey) (born 1944), Swiss ice hockey player
 Hans Keller (speed skater) (born 1931), German Olympic speed skater
 Hans Keller (chess player), Austrian chess player
 Hans Peter Keller (1915–1988), German poet

See also 
 Hansjakob Keller (1921–c. 2008), Swiss rower